The PAF Airpower Centre of Excellence or PAF ACE is an airpower and air warfare research, planning, and development facility of the Pakistan Air Force (PAF) based at PAF Base Mushaf, Sargodha, Pakistan.

Operationally, PAF ACE has the status of a Wing under the PAF's Central Air Command (CAC), with four fighter squadrons of the PAF's Combat Commanders' School (CCS) under its command.

PAF ACE is geared primarily towards the research, planning, and development of airpower and air warfare doctrines and strategies
and linking airpower research and air combat doctrines and strategies with air combat operations to orchestrate effective military air campaigns.

History

Earth-breaking of PAF ACE was done at PAF Base Mushaf on 22 February 2016.

In 2016, the PAF's Combat Commanders' School (CCS) was placed under the operational command of PAF ACE.

Mission

PAF ACE is tasked with the research, planning, and development of airpower and air warfare doctrines and strategies, and towards building a country's capacity to undertake effective air warfare operations. Specifically, PAF ACE aims to build the capacity of air forces to effectively utilize their intelligence, surveillance, reconnaissance (ISR), and precision-strike assets and capabilities in an effective manner.

PAF ACE is also open to air forces from countries deemed friendly to Pakistan.

See also
Pakistan Air Force Academy, Risalpur
Combat Commanders' School, Sargodha
PAF Air War College, Karachi

References

Pakistan Air Force education and training
2016 establishments in Pakistan
Military units and formations established in 2016